Auxilium Pallacanestro Torino was an Italian professional basketball club in Turin, Piedmont. It competed in the first division of Italian basketball, the Lega Basket Serie A for the last time in the 2018–19 season. The club won one trophy, the Italian Basketball Cup, in 2018.

In June 2019, Auxilium was dissolved after the club was declared bankrupt after months of financial struggles, which had led to relegation from the LBA in May.

History

The Beginnings
The club was founded in 1966 under the initiative of Don Gino Borgogno, a Salesian priest, who regrouped all the different oratories (Christian youth social clubs) practising basketball in Turin under one organisation, Auxilium Torino, based in the Agnelli oratory.

The club was promoted to the fourth-division Serie C in 1970 and moved up to the Serie B in 1972. At the same time another local side, Libertas, based in Asti and sponsored by Saclà, was moving quickly up the divisions, reaching the second division in 1971 and the first division Serie A in 1972. However, Saclà Asti wanted to move to a bigger arena and market, transferring to Turin in 1973, which meant the city had two clubs in the national divisions.

The clubs merged in the 1974 offseason after protracted discussions, with Asti president (Carlo Ercole), coach (Lajos Tóth), players, and sponsors transferring to Auxilium (now Saclà Torino) which played in the newly-formed second division Serie A2 while nearly all the Auxilium players were sent to Asti to play in the Serie B.

Serie A
In its first season in Serie A2, Auxilium was promoted to the Serie A.

During the 1975 off-season, the club changed coaches and sponsors, with Martini & Rossi becoming the main sponsor under the Chinamartini brand. The renamed team was relegated domestically, but this was compensated by a run to the 1976 Korać Cup final, in which it came back from a first-leg deficit of 24 points to beat Juventud Schweppes by one point in the semifinals before losing in the final to the Yugoslavian team Jugoplastika Split.

Torino returned to Serie A in 1979, staying there until 1989 and battling for honours during that decade, with playoff semifinals places in 1982, 1984, 1985, and 1986.

After one season in the Serie A2, the club returned to the Serie A in 1990, staying there until 1993.

The Minors
Though the club finished outside the relegation places in the two Serie A2 seasons it played, it struggled financially and, in July 1995, asked the league to play in the Serie B to reduce its debts, also selling its best players for that purpose.

Playing a few years at that level, Auxilium was relegated to Serie B2 at the end of the 1998–99 season, following which it merged with Pallacanestro Cerea Collegno in order to ask for a place in the Serie B1. The latter organisation's president, Giovanni Garrone, became Auxilium president, with the club's base and home arena moved to Collegno. The new organisation did not have more success, and was relegated from the Serie B2 to the Serie C within a year. It played at that level until it was amalgamated into Torino Basket, formed from the merger of two historic Turin clubs, Don Bosco Crocetta and Reale Società Ginnastica, in 2007, disappearing on the occasion.

PMS
PMS Basketball was founded in 2009 by the merger of Pallacanestro Moncalieri and Libertas Amici San Mauro (with the PMS an acronym of Pallacanestro Moncalieri San Mauro). Playing in the Serie B Dilettanti (fourth division), the side won promotion and the league's cup in 2009–10.

In 2011, the senior team, based in Turin and playing in the PalaRuffini - changed its name to PMS Torino, keeping the PMS Basketball name for its youth activities. One year later, Antonio Forni, formerly president of Pallacanestro Biella, joined the founder Paolo Terzolo as club co-president, announcing his desire to return Torino to the Serie within three years. It reached the second division DNA Gold in 2013, losing in the promotion playoffs at the end of the season.

Auxilium comeback

The club obtained promotion at the second try, beating Agrigento in the 2014–15 finals series to earn a place in Serie A. Soon afterwards, it was announced that Forni had obtained the Auxilium brand that Garrone had given to former coach Giovanni Asti when the club shut down, with the club renamed as Auxilium CUS Torino as a separate legal entity with CUS Torino (Centro Universitario Sportivo, a club founded in 1946) providing the youth sector under an agreement. PMS Basketball, with Terzolo at its head, separated from the club to play in Moncalieri, at a level no higher than the Serie B.

Italian Cup winners
The 2018 Italian Basketball Cup was the first played by Auxilium Torino. After beating Umana Reyer Venezia in the quarter-finals and then Vanoli Cremona in the semi-finals, in the final game Sasha Vujačić’s layup in the dying seconds lifted Fiat Torino to a 69-67 victory over Germani Basket Brescia for the club's first Italian Cup. After a series of threes in the closing seconds left the game tied, Brescia had the ball for what appeared to be the final possession, but Marcus Landry and Luca Vitali each missed, Deron Washington picked up the loose ball and started a fast break that Vujacic finished with the winning layup. Diante Garrett paced Fiat with 16 points, Nobel Boungou Colo and Vander Blue added 11 points each and Washington scored 10 for the winners. Landry paced Brescia with 22 points and 9 rebounds and Michele Vitali added 14 points in defeat.

Dissolution
On 10 May 2019, the Federal Council deducted eight points from Torino due to financial irregularities. Consequently, the club was relegated to the Serie A2 Basket after finishing last in the season. On 28 June 2019, the club was declared bankrupt. In Basket Torino, a new professional club from the city was founded.

Arenas
Auxilium Torino played its home games at the 4,500 seat PalaRuffini from 1974 to 2000. From 2000 to 2008, the club used the 1,350 seat PalaCollegno as its home arena. The club returned to PalaRuffini from 2015 to 2018. In 2018, the club moved to the 6,300 seat Palavela.

In European and worldwide competitions

Season by season

Honours

Domestic competitions
 Italian Cup
 Winners (1): 2017–18
 Italian Supercup
 Runners-up (1): 2018

European competitions
 FIBA Korać Cup
 Runners-up (1): 1975–76

Notable players
1970s
  Romeo Sacchetti 5 seasons: '79–'84
  Pino Brumatti 6 seasons: '77–'83

1980s
  Darryl Dawkins 2 seasons: '89–'91
  Alessandro Abbio 6 seasons: '88–'94
  Joe Kopicki 3 seasons: '88–'91
  Giampiero Savio 3 seasons: '85–'88
  Davide Pessina 4 seasons: '84–'88
  Scott May 3 seasons: '83–'86
  Riccardo Morandotti 8 seasons: '82–'90
  Renzo Vecchiato 5 seasons: '82–'87
  Carlo Caglieris 4 seasons: '81–'85

1990s
  Jay Vincent 1 season: '92–'93
  Kevin Magee 1 season: '91–'92

2010s
  Jamil Wilson 2 season: '16–'17, '18–present
  Ryan Hollins 1 season: 2017
  D. J. White 2 season: '15–'17
  Stefano Mancinelli 3 seasons: '13–'16
  Guido Rosselli 2 seasons: '14–'16
  Jerome Dyson 1 season: '15–'16
  James Michael McAdoo 1 season: '18–'19
  Carlos Delfino 1 season: '18–'19
  Sasha Vujačić 1 season: '17–'18
  Trevor Mbakwe 1 season: '17–'18
  Lamar Patterson 1 season: '17–'18
  Victor Rudd 1 season: 2018
  Tony Carr

Head coaches
  Lajos Tóth 1 season: '74–'75
  Giovanni Asti 6 seasons: '76–'77, '80–'83, '87–'89
  Sandro Gamba 3 seasons: '77–'80
  Giuseppe Guerrieri 6 seasons: '83–'86, '89–'91, '93–'95
  Romeo Sacchetti 5 seasons: '96–'98, '96–'98
  Luca Banchi 1 season: '17–'18
  Carlo Recalcati 1 season: '18
  Larry Brown 1 season: '18
  Paolo Galbiati : '18–'19

Sponsorship names
Throughout the years, due to sponsorship deals, it has been known as:

 Saclà Torino (1974–75)
 Chinamartini Torino (1975–79)
 Grimaldi Torino (1979–81)
 Berloni Torino (1981–87)
 San Benedetto Torino (1987–88)
 Ipifim Torino (1988–90)
 Auxilium Torino (1990–91)
 Robe di Kappa (1991–93)
 Francorosso (1993–95)
 Kappa (1995–98)
 Caffarel (1998–99)
 Auxilium Torino (1999–02)
 Iscot Auxilium (2002–08)
 Manital Torino (2015–16)
 FIAT Torino (2016–2019)

References

External links
 Eurobasket club profile
 Serie A historical results. Retrieved 24 August 2015.

1966 establishments in Italy
2009 establishments in Italy
Basketball teams established in 2009
Basketball teams disestablished in 2019
Basketball teams in Piedmont
Basketball teams established in 1966
Sport in Turin